"Good Hearted Woman" is a song written by American country music singers Waylon Jennings and Willie Nelson.

Writing
In 1969, while staying at the Fort Worther Motel in Fort Worth, Texas, Jennings saw an advertisement in a newspaper promoting Tina Turner as a "good hearted woman loving two-timing men", a reference to Ike Turner. Jennings went to talk to Nelson, who was in a middle of a poker game, about writing a song based on that phrase. Joining the game, he and Nelson expanded the lyrics as Nelson's wife Connie Koepke wrote them down.

Recording
Jennings recorded the song for the first time as the title track of his 1972 album Good Hearted Woman, the single peaked at number three on  the Billboard's Hot Country Singles. In 1975, Jennings remixed the song, adding vocals from Willie Nelson (and adding fake crowd noise to give it a live feel) for the album Wanted: The Outlaws!. The album cemented the pair's outlaw image and became country music's first platinum album. The song peaked at number one on Billboard's Hot Country Singles and at number 25 on the Billboard Hot 100. The song won the Single of the Year award in the 1976 Country Music Association Awards, and took Jennings and Nelson to the mainstream audiences, giving them nationwide recognition.

Charts

Waylon Jennings

Waylon Jennings and Willie Nelson

Year-end charts

Cover versions
 In 1976, a duet version of "Good Hearted Woman" performed by Waylon Jennings and Willie Nelson became the first of three number ones on the country chart for the duo.
 The 2005 album Texas Fed, Texas Bred: Redefining Country Music, Volume 1 includes a cover version performed by Guy Clark.
 LeAnn Rimes recorded a version of the song for her 2011 release, Lady & Gentlemen.
 Hank Williams III recorded a version of the song, later released in Long Gone Daddy.
 Tina Turner recorded song for her 1988 album Goes Country.
 George Jones recorded it and included in his 1980 album I Am What I Am.
 Mel Street recorded a version for his 1972 album, Borrowed Angel.
 Micky and the Motorcars (with Cody and Willy Braun) recorded a version for Cross Canadian Ragweed's "The Red River Tribute" to Waylon Jennings (2003)
Marty Stuart and Travis Tritt performed the song for Jerry Bradley at the induction ceremony of Jerry Bradley into the Country Music Hall of Fame in 2019.

References

Works cited

1972 singles
1976 singles
1972 songs
Waylon Jennings songs
Willie Nelson songs
George Jones songs
Tina Turner songs
LeAnn Rimes songs
Male vocal duets
Songs written by Waylon Jennings
Songs written by Willie Nelson
RCA Records singles